Dongdan Station is an interchange station on Line 1 and Line 5 of the Beijing Subway, located at Dongdan.

Station Layout 
Both the line 1 and line 5 station have underground island platforms.

Exits 
There are 8 exits, lettered A, B, C, D, E, F, G, and H. Exits A and F are accessible.

Gallery

References

External links
 

Railway stations in China opened in 1999
Beijing Subway stations in Dongcheng District